Catalina Pella (born 31 January 1993) is an Argentine former professional tennis player. Her brother Guido competes on the ATP World Tour.

In her career, Pella won eleven singles and eleven doubles titles on the ITF Women's Circuit. On 7 November 2016, she reached her best singles ranking of world No. 173. On 23 October 2017, she peaked at No. 123 in the WTA doubles rankings.

Playing for Argentina Fed Cup team, Pella has a win–loss record of 13–8.

ITF Circuit finals

Singles: 25 (11 titles, 14 runner–ups)

Doubles: 23 (11 titles, 12 runner-ups)

National representation
Pella made her Fed Cup debut for Argentina in 2016, while the team was competing in the Americas Zone Group I, when she was 23 years and 3 days old.

Fed Cup (13–8)

Singles (6–6)

Doubles (7–2)

References

External links
 
 
 
 
 

1993 births
Living people
Argentine female tennis players
South American Games bronze medalists for Argentina
South American Games medalists in tennis
Competitors at the 2010 South American Games
Tennis players at the 2019 Pan American Games
Pan American Games competitors for Argentina
21st-century Argentine women